Mandalay University (also translated as University of Mandalay) is a public liberal arts and science university located in Mandalay, Myanmar and one of the sixteen autonomous universities under Ministry of Education. Formerly an affiliate of Rangoon University, Mandalay University is the second oldest university in Myanmar, and the oldest and largest university in Upper Myanmar. The university offers mainly undergraduate and postgraduate degree programmes (Bachelor's, Master's, Post-graduate Diploma, and Doctorate) in liberal arts, sciences and law.

History

Foundation 
Mandalay University was established as Mandalay College, an affiliated college of Rangoon University in 1925. The college was closed down beginning in 1942 because of World War II and was reopened only after the war in 1947.

Expansion 
In 1958, it became an independent university and the only university in Upper Myanmar. Regional colleges like Magwe College, Taunggyi College, Myitkyina College, and Shwebo College became affiliate colleges under Mandalay University.

Per the University Education Act of 1964, which promulgated establishment of specialised universities in Myanmar, Mandalay University's focus was shifted to offer liberal arts, sciences and law degrees only. The university's Faculty of Medicine was carved out to create Institute of Medicine, Mandalay. In 1978, it was renamed Mandalay Arts and Science University (MASU). It again became Mandalay University in 1988 although the university's educational focus remains liberal arts, sciences and law.

Recent history 
The Ministry of Education announced that according to a survey conducted by the National Education Policy Commission, Mandalay University was ranked first among arts and science universities across Myanmar in 2017. The assessments evaluated the quality of the universities' research, training, student wellness, quality of faculty and management.

Departments
With nineteen main and one supporting academic departments, University of Mandalay covers all the major subjects in arts, sciences, law.

Main Departments

 Department of Anthropology
 Department of Archaeology
 Department of Botany
 Department of Chemistry
 Department of Computer Studies
 Department of English
 Department of Geography and Environmental Studies
 Department of Geology
 Department of History
 Department of Industrial Chemistry
 Department of International Relations
 Department of Law
 Department of Mathematics
 Department of Myanmar
 Department of Oriental Studies
 Department of Philosophy
 Department of Physics
 Department of Psychology
 Department of Zoology

Supporting Departments

 Department of Economics

Research Departments

 University Research Centre (URC)

Programmes

University of Mandalay offers undergraduate and postgraduate degree programmes. The undergraduate (Bachelor's) programmes are subdivided into three categories: Liberal Arts (B.A.), Sciences (BSc), and Law(LL.B). The choice of different fields of learning takes place in upper secondary school where students choose particular subjects directed towards their tertiary education. Postgraduate degrees are separated into three groups: Doctorates, Master's, and diplomas. Although Mandalay University used to no longer offer the undergraduate degrees owing to the uprising in 1996, it now was reopened for the undergraduate degree courses with the name of Center of Excellence (COE) in 2014 and accepted only 50 selectively excellent students for each field of studies. (Although undergraduate and postgraduate programmes are still available to current days, the recognition of status of international COE of the university has been discontinued.).

International Collaboration
 Cologne University, Germany (10-8-2013)
 Meijo University, Japan (14-11-2013)
 National University of Singapore, Singapore (19-2-2014)
 Singapore Management University, Singapore (19-2-2014)
 Dongguk University, Korea (15-3-2014)
 King Mongkut's University of Technology Thonburi, Thailand (22-5-2014)
 University of New South Wales, Faculty of Law, Australia (29-5-2014)
 Across Borders Southeast Asia Community Legal Education (Thailand) (10-7-2014) 
 University of Oxford, Department of Earth Sciences, United Kingdom (17-7-2014)
 Yokohama National University, Japan (30-7-2014)
 Gifu University, Japan (25-8-2014)
 Zurich University, Switzerland (19-11-2014)
 Suranaree University of Technology, Thailand (18-12-2014)
 Northern Illinois University, United States (13-2-2015)
 Suratthani Rajabhat University, Thailand (28-2-2015)
 Technical University of Munich, Germany (9-3-2015)
 Chiang Mai University, Thailand (6-4-2015)
 Universitatt Zu Berlin, Institute of Asian and African Studies, Germany (19-4-2015)
 Centre for Geogenetics, Natural History Museum of Denmark, University of Copenhagen, Denmark (24-6-2015)
 Faculty of Science, Prince of Songkla University, Thailand (5-9-2015)
 The Board of Trustees of the Royal Botanic Gardens, Kew (RBG Kew), United Kingdom (22-9-2015)
 University of Florence, Italy (31-10-2015)
 University of California, Riverside, United States (16-2-2016)
 Yunnan University, China (8-3-2016)
 National Chi Nan University, China (27-5-2016)
 University of Natural Resources and Life Sciences, Vienna, Austria (14-6-2016)
 National Astronomical Research Institute of Thailand (15-6-2016)
 Central European University, Hungary (23-8-2016)
 Bard College, United States (23-11-2016)
 Technical University of Dortmund, Germany (2-1-2017)
 Mae Fah Luang University, Thailand (28-6-2017)
 Busan University of Foreign Studies, Korea (1-9-2017)
 Sirindhorn International Institute of Technology, Thammasat University Thailand (27-12-2017)
 Baoshan University, China (3-1-2018)
 Lund University, Sweden (5-3-2018)

CHINLONE
Mandalay University is partner of the "CHINLONE – Connecting Higher Education Institutions for a new leadership on National Education" project. CHINLONE is a three-year (2017-2020) international project in the field of Higher Education funded by the European Union in the frame of the Erasmus+ Capacity Building Key Action 2. The project is coordinated by the University of Bologna (Italy).
CHINLONE key aim is to contribute to the modernization and internationalization of Myanmar’s Higher Education System (HES), in order to facilitate the country’s transition toward a knowledge economy. To reach this goal, the project seeks to ignite a lasting impact in terms of the:
• Modernization of Myanmar’s university management system, through the introduction of innovative and internationally recognized HE principles which can be beneficial to local academic leaders (rectors, vice-rectors, deans, head of departments, etc.);
• Reinforced capacity to design programs, teach, and produce innovative knowledge by local faculty members, according to an approach based on students' learning outcomes. The transition, more specifically, will be tested on three pilot curricula, carefully selected by CHINLONE’s Partner Universities located in Myanmar: Humanities & Cultural Heritage,  Tourism Economics, and Agrarian Sciences.
• Implementation and/or strengthening of International Relations Offices (IROs) in Myanmar’s Universities, as a pivotal step towards the internationalization of the local HES. This process, in fact, can be conducive to an improved positioning of Myanmar’s Universities within global networks, as well as to the exposition of students, faculty members and staff to European consolidated practices toward internationalization.
• Future cooperation between European countries and Myanmar for the exchange of academic knowledge at any level, by framing them in a recognized and internationally regulated scheme.

Library
The library system of UM consists of the Central Library and 21 separate departmental libraries.
The combined holdings include approximately 186,000 books in English for all subjects and 94,000 books in Myanmar.
A new library was completed in 2013 March.
Online library project is being implemented by the Open Society Foundations and American Universities.

History
Mandalay intermediate College Library was established along with the Mandalay Intermediate College in the year 1925. This college and library were totally damaged by the Second World War.
Mandalay University College Library was first started with a nucleus of 2000 volumes on 17thJuly 1947. At that time the library was housed on the second floor of the university main building in the chemical laboratory hall. There, the library was moved to the first floor to main building.
As the collection of document increased, the space was found insufficient for the library. In 1995, the library was shifted to the first floor of the Razak Hall. Razak Hall has been commemorated in honor of late Saya Gyi U Razak who was a great teacher and member of our fallen national leader in independent movement. Again in 1963, it was shifted to the second floor. In 1968, the whole building could be used for the university library. In 2013 the library was moved to the new separate building in the campus. Till to date, the Mandalay University Library is the largest academic library in Upper Myanmar.

Notable alumni

Academia 
 Tun Lwin
 Khin Maung Nyunt

Arts and literature 
 Ludu Daw Amar
 Khin Maung Toe
 Khin Khin Htoo
Ludu Sein Win
Lay Phyu
Nu Nu Yi
 Sai Htee Saing
 Tin Moe
 Lay Phyu

Business 
 Aung Ko Win
 Peter Chou

Politics and Government 
 Aung Thaung
 Kyaw Nyein (minister of PaSaPaLa)
 Khin Maung Myint
 Tun Tun Hein
 Tun Tin
 Henry Van Thio
 Mya Aye
 Khin Maung Thein

References

External links

Mandalay University
Arts and Science universities in Myanmar
Universities and colleges in Myanmar
Educational institutions established in 1925
ASEAN University Network
1925 establishments in Burma